Viðareiði (pronounced , literally: Wood-Isthmus) is the northernmost settlement in the Faroe Islands and lies on the Island of Viðoy, which belongs to the Norðoyar Region.

Geography
It lies on an isthmus with high mountains to both the north and south.

The community is linked overland by a causeway and tunnel system to the regional centre of Klaksvík to the south on Borðoy. The road to Viðareiði goes along the west coast of Viðoy, through the town, and then along the island's east coast to the uninhabited Miðdalur Valley with its typical small waterfall.

It is the highest mountain in the North Islands and the third-largest in the entire Faroese archipelago. Looking to the west from Viðareiði, one has a view of the mighty northern peaks on Borðoy and Kunoy. Turning around, one can see through the crag and tails of the isthmus to the eastern Island of Fugloy. Viðareiði is a departure point for a vast area of hiking. In the community, there is not only a small grocery store, but also the Hotel Norð with its restaurant that serves traditional cuisine.

History 

In the 17th century, the old church was destroyed in a storm.  It is said that a part of the cemetery was washed away by the sea and that coffins from the cemetery were recovered in Hvannasund and reburied in Viðareiði.

The current church was built in 1892.  The church silver is a gift from the British government, thanking Viðareiði's citizens for the rescue of the brig Marwood, which was shipwrecked near Viðareiði during a winter storm in 1847.

See also 

 List of towns in the Faroe Islands

References 

 The information in this article is based on that in its German equivalent.
 Faroeislands.dk: Vidareidi

External links

 Official website

Municipalities of the Faroe Islands
Populated places in the Faroe Islands
Populated coastal places in the Faroe Islands